Chibougamau is the largest town in Nord-du-Québec, central Quebec, Canada. Located on Lake Gilman it has a population of 7,504 people (2016 Canadian Census).  Chibougamau is surrounded by, but not part of, the local municipality of Eeyou Istchee James Bay Regional Government.

Despite Chibougamau's remoteness, it is only about as far north as Winnipeg, and is south of any part of the mainland of England.

Nearby are Lake Aux Dorés, which is fed by the Chibougamau River from the larger Chibougamau Lake, after which the town was named. Chibougamau means "Gathering place" in the Cree language. The neighbouring Cree village of Oujé-Bougoumou has the same name with a more traditional Cree spelling.

The area surrounding Lake Gilman is Obalski Park. Its amenities include a beach, pier, picnic tables, cabins, among others. The many trails allow for hiking, cycling, cross-country skiing, or even snowmobiling through the park's boreal forest.

Access to the town is by Route 167 from Lac Saint-Jean and by Route 113 from Lebel-sur-Quévillon. Chibougamau's airport is along Route 113, about halfway to Chapais.

History
The area has long been part of the Cree territory. It was in the early 17th century that French explorers and traders, including Charles Albanel in 1671, came to the Lake Chibougamau area. However, no permanent European settlements were established at that time.

Only in the late 19th century did the area attract the interest of mining prospectors. When gold was discovered in 1903, there were periods of intense exploration. Due to difficulty of access, no lasting development took place at that time. Not until 1949 was copper first exploited, with the opening of a multi-metallic mine in the area, and a permanent community was established in 1952. Chibougamau started out as a company town but soon after, in 1954, it was incorporated as a municipality. Many mines have exploited the area since. While still thought of as a mining town, Chibougamau is now also the centre of a large logging and sawmill industry.

From 1962 to 1988, the Royal Canadian Air Force operated CFS Chibougamau, a radar station in Chibougamau that was part of the Pinetree Line. The complex has now been transformed into a golf complex and an office for a mining company.

Since December 2001, the mayor of Chibougamau is also part of the municipal council of Municipality of Baie-James.

The city is home to an annual "Folies frettes" festival ("Cold Follies") and a snowmobile rally.

Demographics

The median age is 40.8, as opposed to 41.6 for all of Canada. French was the mother tongue of 92.5% of residents in 2021. The next most common mother tongues were English at 3.0%, followed by Cree-Innu languages at 1.6%. 0.9% reported both English and French as their first language. Additionally there were 0.2% who reported both French and a non-official language as their mother tongue.

As of 2021, Indigenous peoples comprised 7.8% of the population and visible minorities contributed 3.9%. The largest visible minority groups in Chibougamau are Black (1.5%), Filipino (1.1%), and Arab (0.8%). The region is home to 555 recent immigrants (i.e. those arriving between 2016 and 2021).

In 2021, 67.7% of the population identified as Catholic, while 22.8% said they had no religious affiliation. Pentecostals were the largest religious minority, at 1.3% of the population, while Muslims were the largest non-Christian religious minority, making up 0.8% of the population.

Counting both single and multiple responses, the most commonly identified ethnocultural ancestries were:

(Percentages may total more than 100% due to rounding and multiple responses).

Education
French-language schools in Chibougamau, past and present, are:
École Bon-Pasteur
École Vatican II
École Notre-Dame-du-Rosaire
École La Porte-du-Nord
École Vinette (closed 1994)
Centre de formation professionnelle de la Baie-James
Centre d'études collégiales Chibougamau

The English-language school is MacLean Memorial School. formerly Chibougamau Protestant School.  There also used to be a Catholic English-language school called Holy Family School.

Climate
Chibougamau has a subarctic climate (Köppen climate classification Dfc), despite being located just south of 50 degrees latitude. Precipitation is significant year round though February through April are drier.

See also
Jamésie 
List of communities in Quebec

References

Notes

Sources 
St.-Hilaire, Marc. "Chibougamuau", in The Canadian Encyclopedia, Volume 1, p. 407. Edmonton: Hurtig Publishing, 1988.

External links

Official site
Municipality of Baie-James

Chibougamau
Cities and towns in Quebec
Hudson's Bay Company trading posts
Incorporated places in Nord-du-Québec
James Bay
Jamésie